Maxine Weatherby (born April 7, 2001) is an American ice dancer who competes for Kazakhstan. With her skating partner, Temirlan Yerzhanov, she is the 2020 Kazakhstani national champion and the 2019 Denis Ten Memorial Challenge bronze medalist. They competed in the final segment at the 2020 Four Continents Championships.

Personal life 
Weatherby was born on April 7, 2001 in Changsha, China. She was adopted at age 11 months by American parents from South Florida. Weatherby works as a skating coach at Palm Beach Ice Works in West Palm Beach, where she also trains.

Career

Early career 
Weatherby began skating in 2004. She competed in ladies' singles for nine years before switching to pairs. With Mickey Sinthawachiwa, she finished ninth in intermediate pairs at the 2014 U.S. Championships. During the 2016–17 season, Weatherby and Jonathan Kim finished fourth in novice pairs at the Pacific Coast Sectionals to qualify for the 2017 U.S. Championships, but they withdrew and did not compete. She switched to ice dance the following season with Dmitriy Bogomol as her partner. Weatherby/Bogomol finished seventh in novice dance at the 2018 U.S. Championships. They competed at one event during the 2018–19 season, the 2018 Chesapeake Open, before splitting.

Weatherby teamed up with Temirlan Yerzhanov to represent his native Kazakhstan in July 2018. They had previously known each other while training in Coral Springs, Florida and tried out on the suggestion of Weatherby's mother. Weatherby/Yerzhanov train under Evgeni Platov in West Palm Beach and John Kerr in Pembroke Pines. Although Weatherby represents Kazakhstan, the federation does not cover her expenses due to her being American by nationality.

During their first season together in 2018–19, Weatherby/Yerzhanov won the silver medal at the 2019 Kazakhstani Championships behind Gaukhar Nauryzova / Boyisangur Datiev and finished eighth at the Bavarian Open.

2019–2020 season 
Weatherby/Yerzhanov opened their season at the Lake Placid Ice Dance International, where they placed 12th. They then finished eighth at the 2019 CS U.S. Classic. At the Denis Ten Memorial Challenge in October, Weatherby/Yerzhanov won their first international medal, bronze behind Germans Katharina Müller / Tim Dieck and Adelina Galyavieva / Louis Thauron of France. They also earned the technical minimums to compete at the 2020 Four Continents Championships and 2020 World Championships. After the event, Yerzhanov said he had always "dreamed of skating in Kazakhstan" and competing in front of his family. Weatherby/Yerzhanov won the national title at the 2020 Kazakhstani Championships.

At Four Continents, Weatherby/Yerzhanov were 16th in the rhythm dance and 15th in the free dance to finish 16th overall. The World Championships were cancelled due to the COVID-19 pandemic. During the ensuing lockdown, Weatherby/Yerzhanov trained separately for a time due to rinks being closed in Florida, before eventually meeting up to practice lifts off-ice.

2020–2021 season 
There were limited opportunities to compete due to the pandemic. Weatherby/Yerzhanov planned to compete at the 2021 World Championships if they were not cancelled, but were missing from the initial entry list.

Programs 
 With Yerzhanov

Competitive highlights 
CS: Challenger Series. Pewter medals (4th place) awarded only at U.S. national, sectional, and regional events.

Ice dance with Yerzhanov

Ice dance with Bogomol

Pairs with Kim

Pairs with Sinthawachiwa

Detailed results 
ISU Personal Bests highlighted in bold.

 With Yerzhanov

References

External links 
 
 

2001 births
Living people
Chinese adoptees
American adoptees
American sportspeople of Chinese descent
American female ice dancers
Kazakhstani female ice dancers
Sportspeople from Changsha